Aursjøen is a lake in Norway on the border between Lesja Municipality in Innlandet county and Molde Municipality in Møre og Romsdal county.

The lake was dammed up in 1953 to provide water for the Aura power station. It flooded together with the nearby lake Gautsjøen. The water in lake Aursjøen flows out to the river Aura which flows through the Eikesdalen valley and eventually to the lake Eikesdalsvatnet.

See also
List of lakes in Norway

References

Molde
Lesja
Lakes of Innlandet
Lakes of Møre og Romsdal
Reservoirs in Norway